Vepris glaberrima, synonym Oriciopsis glaberrima, is a species of plant in the family Rutaceae. It is native to Cameroon, the Central African Republic, the Republic of the Congo and Gabon. It is threatened by habitat loss.

References

Sources

Flora of West-Central Tropical Africa
glaberrima
Near threatened plants
Taxonomy articles created by Polbot